The Bernam River is located between the Malaysian states of Perak and Selangor, demarcating the border of the two states. The Bernam River flows from Mount Liang Timur (Mount Liang East) in the east on the Titiwangsa Mountains to the Straits of Malacca in the west. The peak of Mount Liang Timur itself marks the tripoint where Pahang, Perak and Selangor meet.

The eastern part of the river is suitable for palm oil and rubber tree plantation, while swamps fill the western areas. A percentage of the swampy areas have been reclaimed and dried up by a drainage system. Some has been converted into paddy fields.

Archeologists have discovered several archaeological sites along the river, where ancient artifacts were found. Excavation works had been carried out by experts from various local universities and Muzium Sultan Alam Shah.

Towns along the river basin
 Tanjong Malim
 Ulu Bernam
 Behrang
 Slim River
 Sabak
 Sungai Ayer Tawar
 Bagan Nakhoda Omar
 Hutan Melintang
 Bagan Datoh

See also
 List of rivers of Malaysia

References

Rivers of Selangor
Rivers of Perak
Borders of Malaysia
Rivers of Malaysia